Tomoplagia variabilis is a species of tephritid or fruit flies in the genus Tomoplagia of the family Tephritidae.

Distribution
Brazil.

References

Tephritinae
Insects described in 2004
Diptera of South America